Cristián Andrés de la Fuente Sabarots (born March 10, 1974) is a Chilean-American actor, presenter, model and producer.

Early life
Cristian De la Fuente was born in Santiago, Chile, the only child of chemist Hugo de la Fuente (died 1996) and Adriana Sabarots, a homemaker of French descent. He served in the Chilean Air Force reserve prior to attending the Pontifical Catholic University of Chile, where he pursued a degree in civil engineering.

Career

1998–2003
De la Fuente was spotted by a talent scout during his sophomore year as a civil engineering major at the Pontifical Catholic University of Chile, and won a contest as Chile's next "Super Teen". Beginning with small network roles in prime time, he quickly went on to star in four prime time dramas including Eclipse de Luna and the highly acclaimed televised theatrical production of La Tía de Carlos. He starred in Chile's number-one rated variety program Venga Conmigo, the comedy Mi Tío y Yo alongside Gonzalo Robles, and the MTV-style music and dance program Generación 2000.

In 1998, de la Fuente was contracted by Sony and Telemundo for a drama series remake of Starsky and Hutch called Reyes y Rey. The weekly hour format did not catch on with Hispanic viewers and it was soon cancelled. He was a guest star on Pensacola: Wings of Gold. He has also appeared regularly on CSI: Miami and Family Law. He has starred opposite Sylvester Stallone in Driven, in John Carpenter's Vampires: Los Muertos with Jon Bon Jovi, as well as the independent thriller Minimal Knowledge.

For his starring role in the independent thriller Minimal Knowledge, de la Fuente won the Individual Achievement Award for Best Male Actor at the Ajijic International Film Festival.

De la Fuente's hosting credits include MGM's Road to the Academy Awards for Latin America and the Walt Disney World Christmas Day Parade. He has also presented the Billboard Latin Music Awards, The World Music Awards, and the Alma Awards. De la Fuente also turned up in John McTiernan's military thriller Basic opposite John Travolta, and enjoyed several appearances on CSI: Miami as lab tech Sam Belmontes between 2003 and 2004.

2004–2007
In 2004, De la Fuente hosted alongside Kate del Castillo the first annual Premios Juventud on the Univision television network. In 2005, he starred in the Venevisión's Miami-made telenovela Soñar No Cuesta Nada, starring alongside Mexican actresses Karyme Lozano and Laura Zapata. It was a huge hit in the daytime slot on Univision. It ran for 191 episodes. On Univisión there were talks for him to host a night time talk show, but nothing came of it. He also had a recurring role as Aaron in the CBS sitcom The Class.

In 2005, Cristián was seen in supporting roles in the indie romantic drama Sueño with John Leguizamo and the Latin-themed comedy Once Upon a Wedding. He was a popular host for Spanish-language specials and series during this period, including the 2005 Latin Grammy Awards, the 2006 Premios Juventud, and the Chilean reality series Golpe Bajo, for which he also served as executive producer and writer. In 2005, he starred in the popular Venezuelan telenovela Soñar no Cuesta Nada, which filmed in Miami, Florida. De la Fuente also guest starred in three episodes of UPN's One on One, and in an episode of the wildly popular ABC show Ugly Betty. Amidst all the acting gigs, he continued to maintain his status with the Chilean Air Force, for which he occasionally performed as part of the aerial acrobatic troupe, Halcones. In the fall of 2007, he participated in the mini-series directed by Jennifer Lopez, Como Ama Una Mujer with the actress Leonor Varela.

2008–present

De la Fuente appeared as a contestant on the sixth season of ABC's Dancing With the Stars with dance partner Cheryl Burke. They trained at Palm Beach, Florida's Paramount Ballroom, which is owned by former U.S. Nine-Dance Champion Alec Lazo. De la Fuente suffered a ruptured tendon in his left arm biceps on the April 28, 2008 episode of Dancing with the Stars. The following week, performing with his injured arm, he and Burke led the field. He was eliminated on May 20, 2008 in 3rd place.

De la Fuente hosted the Latin Grammy Awards of 2008 on November 13, 2008 in Houston, Texas.

In 2009, de la Fuente guest starred in the telenovelas Fuego en la sangre as Demian Ferrer, and Corazón salvaje as Renato.

From 2008-2010, de la Fuente played Raphael "Raph" Ramírez, a minor league baseball player and semi-boyfriend of Mary Shannon on In Plain Sight.

De la Fuente returned to Chile to film the season 2 of his TV show Golpe Bajo, similar to MTV's series Punk'd.

De la Fuente also had a recurring role on Brothers & Sisters from 2009-2010.

De la Fuente had recurring roles on ABC's Private Practice during its fourth season and on ABC Family's The Nine Lives of Chloe King during its first and only season.

De la Fuente starred as Maximiliano Montesinos, the protagonist in the Mexican telenovela Quiero amarte.

De la Fuente has been tapped to play Ricardo De La Cruz in the romantic comedy film Switch Up, helmed by Tara Pirnia in her directing debut.

Dancing with the Stars performances

Filmography

Film

Television roles

Awards And Nominations

References

External links

Cristian de la Fuente in his profile as a stunt pilot of the Air Force of Chile

1974 births
Living people
Male actors from Santiago
Chilean Air Force personnel
Chilean engineers
Chilean male film actors
Chilean male telenovela actors
Participants in American reality television series
Chilean people of French descent
Chilean male television actors
Chilean male models
20th-century Chilean military personnel